Priya Guha MBE (born 1973) is a British business executive who is general manager of Rocketspace in London. Previously she was a diplomat who served as British Consul-General in San Francisco 2011–2016. She was the first woman to hold the post.

Guha studied at Christ's College, Cambridge, and joined the Foreign Office in 1996. Prior to San Francisco, she spent four years at the British High Commission in India, where she was First Secretary for Political and Bilateral Affairs (2007–11), leading on Indian politics and the UK-India bilateral relationship.

References

External links

 https://twitter.com/UKPriyaGuha

1973 births
Living people
Alumni of Christ's College, Cambridge
British diplomats
British businesspeople